The cheese dream is an open-faced version of the American grilled cheese sandwich made with bread and cheese; it is cooked with either oil, margarine, or butter. Other ingredients such as bacon, avocado, pineapple, eggs, or sliced tomato can be optionally added to the open-faced sandwich as well.

It can be cooked in a pan or skillet on the stove top, under a broiler or using a pan in the oven. In its simplest form, it consists of a slice of bread, topped with American cheese, and broiled until the cheese puffs up and browns. Variants include the addition of ingredients such as bacon, sliced tomato, pineapple, avocado, and eggs.

History
Made with basic ingredients (bread, butter and cheese) and heated, cheese dreams are said to have originated as "the cheese dream" during the Great Depression, as "an inexpensive company supper dish" and an inexpensive option for feeding friends and family at Sunday supper. Additions of sliced tomatoes, ham and bacon could be used, and they were often accompanied by olives and pickles. A 1932 San Jose News story, "Cheese Dream New Favorite Sandwich," suggested sprinkling the cheese "very sparingly" with a bit of mustard, cayenne "and a little minced red sweet pepper"; the sandwich was browned on both sides and served with "very hot, rich tomato sauce." The sandwiches may predate the Depression, however, as a 1918 Good Housekeeping issue mentions Cheese Dreams as a luncheon dish, "our teahouse friend."

Cheese dreams were advertised in 1957 as a 55 cent luncheonette lenten special in Daytona Beach, Florida's Sunday News Journal. In 1960, the Milwaukee Journal recommended preparing Cheese Dreams in the oven with scrambled eggs and ham.

Recent interest
Popular in the 1950s as a comfort food, the grilled cheese sandwich has made a comeback in various incarnations in the 1990s and 2000s. It was estimated in 2001 that Americans consume around 2.2 billion grilled cheese sandwiches yearly and chefs have experimented with different types of bread and cheese in updates of the classic, old-fashioned cheese dream. Pumpernickel, sourdough, dark brown and rye bread have been used, topped with Swiss cheese, Gouda and havarti respectively. Other options include apples with mozzarella, peaches with edam and pear with gorgonzola or brie; Italian herbs, sun-dried tomatoes and mozzarella; or turkey and ham, with which "a variation on a Monte Cristo" can also be created. Scott Fletcher of the Grafton Village Cheese Company makes cheese dreams with rustic country bread, sharp Cheddar cheese, white pepper, eggs, milk, unsalted butter and maple syrup.

See also
 Cheese on toast, the open-faced sandwich popular in the UK
 Open sandwich
 Grilled cheese, a closed, melted, cheese sandwich
 Monte Cristo sandwich
 Croque-monsieur, the French fried cheese and ham sandwich 
 Welsh rarebit, cheese sauce served over toasted bread
 Fondue, the cheese sauce that food is dipped in, from Switzerland
 Comfort food
 List of sandwiches
 Dream of the Rarebit Fiend, a comic by Winsor McCay in which cheese on toast inspired strange dreams
 Toast sandwich

References

Cheese sandwiches
American sandwiches